Social Capital Entertainment is an American film production company involved in film, music and interactive entertainment. The company was founded in 2004 by producer and real estate investor Martin Shore together with Jonathan Platt and Jonathan Miller.  

Social Capital produced and financed the psychological thriller, Tell-Tale, together with Ridley and Tony Scott.  Tell Tale starred Josh Lucas, Lena Heady and Brian Cox, and was directed by Michael Cuesta (L.I.E., Dexter). They are soon to release 2001 Maniacs: Field of Screams, the sequel to 2001 Maniacs, the 2005 Social Capital horror film.

Other previous films include the period drama The Countess (Julie Delpy's follow-up to 2 Days in Paris) and Snoop Dogg's Hood of Horror (Lionsgate). The company has also produced soundtracks for such films as Saw (Lionsgate), Saw II (Lionsgate), Rize (Lionsgate) and Rock School (Newmarket), as well as for television series including Summerland.

See also
Social Capital Films — subsidiary.

References

Film production companies of the United States
Entertainment companies based in California
Companies based in Santa Monica, California
Entertainment companies established in 2004
2004 establishments in California